Mitic is a town located within the municipality of Jalostotitlán in Los Altos region of the Mexican state of Jalisco. It has a population of 33, 19 men and 14 women.

History
The residents of the area were mostly from the Tecuexe tribe.

References

Populated places in Jalisco